Naohiko (written: 直彦 "honest, prince") is a masculine Japanese given name. Notable people with the name include:

, Japanese ice sledge hockey player
, Japanese footballer and manager
, Japanese footballer

Japanese masculine given names